Xerocoprinus is a fungal genus in the family Agaricaceae. This is a monotypic genus, containing the single species Xerocoprinus arenarius, originally named Coprinus arenarius by Narcisse Théophile Patouillard in 1896. Xerocoprinus was circumscribed by French mycologist René Maire in 1907.

See also
 List of Agaricales genera
 List of Agaricaceae genera

References

Agaricaceae
Monotypic Agaricales genera